Angaleena Loletta McCoy Presley (born September 1, 1976) is an American country music singer-songwriter. She is a member of the country trio Pistol Annies, which was formed in 2011 with Miranda Lambert and Ashley Monroe, and has released two solo albums, American Middle Class (2014) and Wrangled (2017).

Career
In 2000, Presley moved to Nashville, Tennessee, where she landed a publishing deal nine months later. Through her publisher she met Ashley Monroe, who later brought Presley's music to the attention of her friend Miranda Lambert. The three artists began working together writing songs, which would later become Pistol Annies' debut album Hell on Heels, released on August 23, 2011. The group spent much of the next two years touring North America and writing songs for their follow-up album. On May 7, 2013, Pistol Annies released their second album Annie Up. On June 17, 2013, the RIAA announced that the album and single for Hell on Heels had both sold in excess of 500,000 copies, giving Pistol Annies their first Gold Record. In 2014 Presley released her solo album American Middle Class, co-produced with her husband Jordan Powell. In 2017, Presley released her second solo album, Wrangled.

Personal life
Angaleena Presley was born in Martin County, Kentucky, and raised in Beauty, Kentucky. Her father Jimmy Presley Sr., is a retired coal miner and her mother, Cathy Presley (née McCoy), is a retired school teacher. At age 15, her father taught her how to play her first song on his guitar, "Mama Tried" by Merle Haggard. She attended Sheldon Clark High School in Inez, Kentucky, and graduated in 1994 before attending college at Eastern Kentucky University. Presley started work as a songwriter in Nashville in 2002, and later wrote the song "Knocked Up" from her own personal experience of being pregnant and unmarried. She has a son, Jed, born in 2007. When the Pistol Annies were first forming in the early 2010s, Presley was going through a divorce. She insists her upbringing was not "the stark, poverty-stricken one as committed to record on the 'Coal Miner's Daughter' by Loretta Lynn. That doesn't mean the Presleys didn't struggle, however, or that the singer led a charmed life once she left Beauty." On May 22, 2012, she married manager/producer Jordan Powell in a small ceremony in Jackson Hole, Wyoming. On August 15, 2018, Presley confirmed she was pregnant with her second child (her first with Powell) and gave birth to their daughter Joeleena in January 2019.

Discography

Studio albums

Music videos

Songwriting discography

Awards and nominations

References

External links
Pistolannies.com
Kentucky.com
Theboot.com
Rollingstone.com

1976 births
Living people
Country musicians from Kentucky
People from Martin County, Kentucky
RCA Records Nashville artists
Pistol Annies members
American women country singers
American country singer-songwriters
Singer-songwriters from Kentucky
21st-century American singers
21st-century American women singers
Thirty Tigers artists